McGuire is an Irish surname.

McGuire may also refer to:

 McGuire (Formula One), 1977 Formula One constructor from Australia
 McGuire, Arkansas, a ghost town
 McGuire, Missouri, an unincorporated community
 McGuire, Ohio, a ghost town
 Mount McGuire, mountain in Jasper National Park, Alberta, Canada
 McGuire Island (disambiguation), two islands
 McGuire Air Force Base, US Air Force base in Burlington County, New Jersey
 McGuire Nuclear Generating Station, Charlotte, North Carolina, USA

See also
 Maguire (disambiguation)
 Mark McGwire